Harvey Spevak is the Executive Chairman and Managing Partner of Equinox Group.

Career 
In 2000, he led a management buyout of Equinox to two private equity firms, North Castle Partners and J.W. Childs. In 2006, he partnered with Related Principles to acquire and secure a significant minority investment from global consumer-focused private equity firm Catterton in 2017.

Equinox acquired SoulCycle in May 2011.

In 2019, Spevak opened Equinox's 100th club in Hudson Yards, Manhattan, followed by the brand's first hotel, as well as coworking venture Industrious at Equinox, in the same neighborhood.

References

American business executives
Living people
Year of birth missing (living people)